Charles George Roebuck (born 14 August 1991) is an English first-class cricketer. A right-handed batsman and right-arm medium fast bowler, Roebuck is contracted to Yorkshire County Cricket Club, for whom he has played one first-class match in 2010.

Biography
Roebuck has been with Yorkshire since 2007, and has played for the Yorkshire Academy in the Yorkshire ECB County Premier League, and the Yorkshire Second XI in the Second XI Championship, as well as appearing in one first-class match for Yorkshire. This was against India A in June 2010, when Roebuck scored 23 runs in his only innings.

Roebuck has also played in one Test match for England Under 19s against Bangladesh Under 19s, and four One Day Internationals against the same opponents.

In 2011, Roebuck played for the Durham Second XI.

References

1991 births
Living people
Cricketers from Huddersfield
English cricketers
Yorkshire cricketers
Leeds/Bradford MCCU cricketers